"White Tee" is a 2004 song by Dem Franchize Boyz, which appeared on their debut album Dem Franchize Boyz, released on So So Def Records and Universal Records.

Playboi Carti sampled the song on his single "Woke Up Like This". In 2020, Travis Scott released the song "Franchise", which interpolates and pays homage to "White Tee" in its chorus.

Controversy
An article in the Pittsburgh Post-Gazette, which mentions the song, and the fashion statement, stated that after the release of the song, many clubs and schools began to ban the use of white T-shirts on the basis that the shirts were associated with gangs.

Music video
The video for the song begins with a faux news report by "Robert Watson" from Atlanta, who is holding a microphone with "DFB" on it. He is talking about waiting from a call from the governor, when his phone rings.  He then tells the camera that he "just saved a bunch of money on wardrobe by switching to White Tee's", in reference to Geico commercials.  The video then progresses into the song, where everyone is shown wearing white T-shirts as they perform numerous activities such as riding "quads", dancing on cars, skateboarding and riding bikes.

Remix
The official remix features So So Def labelmates Jermaine Dupri and The Kid Slim. The remix is the last track (hidden track) off the group's next album, On Top of Our Game.

Charts

Release history

References

Crunk songs

2004 debut singles
Dem Franchize Boyz songs
2004 songs
Universal Music Group singles
So So Def Recordings singles